David Richard Evans (born February 1961) is a British political official who has served as general secretary of the Labour Party since 25 September 2021, having acted as general secretary since 26 May 2020. He served as an assistant general secretary of the Labour Party from 1999 to 2001. Evans was the regional director of the North West Labour Party from 1995 to 1999 and founded The Campaign Company, a political consultancy.

Early life and career 

Evans was born in February 1961 in Chester, moving to London when he was three. He was an activist during the miners' strike of 1984–85, during which time he was arrested "for something like highway obstruction as he delivered a food parcel to the striking miners".

He served as a Labour councillor in Croydon from 1986 to 1990. He was regional secretary of the Labour Party for North West England from 1995 to 1999. During this time he organised Labour's campaign in the 1997 Wirral South by-election, when the party gained the seat for the first time. Evans went on to serve as assistant general secretary of the Labour Party from 1999 to 2001. In 1999 he wrote a proposal to "overhaul" the party's structures, suggesting that "representative democracy should as far as possible be abolished in the Party" in favour of elections by one member, one vote. Evans argued this would "empower modernising forces within the party and marginalise Old Labour".  He "played a key backroom role in [Labour's] 2001 election victory".

In 2001, Evans and Jonathan Upton, formerly Labour's head of corporate development, started a political consultancy in Croydon called The Campaign Company. The company supported Labour politicians Tony Banks and Robert Evans to seek selection. Evans' wife, Aline Delawa, was company secretary in 2002, at the same time as running the party's "constitutional and legal affairs unit". In 2002 the company was hired to support the cross-party European Movement which was lobbying for Britain to change currency to the Euro. The Daily Telegraph described the company as a "lobbying firm which advises the NHS, Government departments and political activists seeking selection as party candidates".

Evans served on the board of Chester F.C. and now serves on Chester F.C. Community Trust's board.

Electoral history

General Secretary 

After the Labour Party lost the 2019 general election, Jeremy Corbyn resigned as leader of the Labour Party. After his successor, Keir Starmer, was elected, Jennie Formby, considered an ally of Corbyn, resigned as general secretary of the party. A number of candidates were shortlisted to replace Formby, including Evans, Andrew Fisher, Neena Gill and Byron Taylor, who was considered to be the other candidate most likely to be appointed to the position. Evans was appointed on 26 May 2020, after twenty of the thirty-eight National Executive Committee members voted for him. His appointment was seen as a victory for Starmer, as Evans was described by The Independent as Starmer's "first choice" candidate. The Jewish Chronicle described Evans as a "staunch opponent of hard left politics" and a "fierce critic of anti-Zionism".

On 29 October 2020, Evans, along with the party's chief whip Nick Brown, suspended former leader Jeremy Corbyn due to his response to the Equality and Human Rights Commission's report into antisemitism in the Labour Party.

Personal life 
Evans played bass and sang in the post-punk collective Greenfield Leisure, and supports Chester FC.

References 

Living people
Labour Party (UK) officials
British political consultants
People from Chester
Alumni of the University of York
1961 births